Ain't In No Hurry is the twelfth solo studio album by Jorma Kaukonen.

Track listing

Personnel
Jorma Kaukonen – guitar, liner notes, vocals

Additional musicians
Larry Campbell – bass, fiddle, guitar, lap steel guitar, mandolin, pedal steel guitar, production, resonator guitar, vocals
Jack Casady – bass on "Bar Room Crystal Ball"
Justin Guip – drums, engineer, mixing
Myron Hart – bass
Barry Mitterhoff – mandolin

Technical personnel
Scotty Hall – photography
Vanessa Lillian – photography
Kevin Morgan – design
Teresa Williams – vocals

References

External links

American Songwriter article

2015 albums
Albums produced by Larry Campbell (musician)
Jorma Kaukonen albums
Red House Records albums